"I Put My Blue Genes On" is a science fiction short story by American writer  Orson Scott Card, first published in the August 1978 issue of Analog. It also appears in his short story collections Unaccompanied Sonata and Other Stories and Maps in a Mirror.

Plot summary
The story takes place far in the future.  Earth has become an uninhabitable wasteland of biological warfare.  After fleeing Earth decades earlier, a contingent of humans returns to find a small band of beings, now not quite human, still fighting an enemy which has long since been annihilated.  The title refers to the planet's surface, which has become a swirling mass of blue goo, a result of the biological agents acting and reacting one with another.

See also 
List of works by Orson Scott Card

External links 
 
 The official Orson Scott Card website

Short stories by Orson Scott Card
Works originally published in Analog Science Fiction and Fact
1978 short stories